A phanerite is an igneous rock whose microstructure is made up of crystals large enough to be distinguished with the unaided human eye. In contrast, the crystals in an aphanitic rock are too fine-grained to be identifiable. Phaneritic texture forms when magma deep underground in the plutonic environment cools slowly, giving the crystals time to grow. 

Phanerites are often described as coarse-grained or macroscopically crystalline.

References

Phaneritic rocks
Petrology